Piers Rolf Garfield Merchant (2 January 1951 – 21 September 2009) was a British Conservative Party politician. He was the Member of Parliament (MP) for Newcastle upon Tyne Central from 1983 to 1987, and then MP for Beckenham from 1992 until he resigned in October 1997 following a scandal.

Education 
Merchant was educated at Nottingham High School and the University of Durham, where he studied law and politics. He then worked for nine years at The Journal (Newcastle).

Political career 
Merchant was first elected to the House of Commons at the 1983 general election for the Newcastle Central constituency, but lost his seat in the 1987 general election. He returned to parliament as the MP for Beckenham at the 1992 general election.

He was caught by The Sun romancing with a teenage nightclub hostess on a park bench in south-east London.

He resigned in 1997 following allegations that he was having an affair with his researcher. He later claimed that the whole affair had been set up by his one time assistant and family friend, Anthony Gilberthorpe, for a payment of £25,000 from the Sunday Mirror.

In the 2004 European Parliament election, Merchant stood for the United Kingdom Independence Party (UKIP) in the North East England constituency at the top of its party list. He was not elected. In 2005 he was the UKIP candidate for the Torrington Rural ward in the Devon County Council election, but finished fourth of the four candidates.

Piers Merchant worked for some years in various capacities for UKIP, and was at one time political advisor to Roger Knapman during the 2004 European election; also, for a time, he acted as UKIP General Secretary.

Personal life
In 2005, Merchant and his family moved to Great Torrington in North Devon.

In July 2009 he was diagnosed with advanced multisite metastatic prostate cancer. He died on 21 September 2009.

References

External links 
 

1951 births
2009 deaths
Alumni of University College, Durham
Conservative Party (UK) MPs for English constituencies
People educated at Nottingham High School
People from Beckenham
UK MPs 1983–1987
UK MPs 1992–1997
UK MPs 1997–2001
UK Independence Party politicians